No Burden is the debut studio album by American singer-songwriter Lucy Dacus, released February 26, 2016 by EggHunt Records, then subsequently re-released September 9, 2016 by Matador Records. It was promoted by the singles “I Don’t Wanna Be Funny Anymore” and “Strange Torpedo”. The album was recorded in one day in Nashville, with a band that had barely learned the songs.

Critical reception

‘No Burden’’ received a score of 79 out of 100 based on 11 reviews from media aggregate site Metacritic, indicating “generally favorable reviews”.

The album was Magnet’s choice for the best album of 2016, comparing it to the likes of Laura Marling and Erika Wennerstrom. Paste named it the eighth best album of the year, calling it “surprisingly genuine and mature”. Under the Radar named it the 48th best album of 2016.

Track listing

References

2016 debut albums
Lucy Dacus albums
Matador Records albums